The 2011 Lucas Oil Off Road Racing Series (a short course off-road racing series), is the third season of the Lucas Oil Off Road Racing Series.

Tracks 

The series will visit five different venues in 2011.

 Firebird International Raceway, Phoenix, AZ
 Speedworld Off Road Park, Surprise, AZ
 Glen Helen Raceway, San Bernardino, CA
 Miller Motorsports Park, Toelle, UT
 Las Vegas Motor Speedway, Las Vegas, NV

Race results 

The season consists of 15 championship rounds. The final round will count toward the Lucas Oil Off Road Challenge Cup.

Trucks and buggies

Karts and UTVs

References

Lucas Oil Off Road Racing Series
Lucas Oil Off Road Racing Series